Aindlinger Baggersee is a lake in Swabia, Bavaria, Germany. At an elevation of 434 m, its surface area is 9 ha. It is just west of the town Todtenweis.

Lakes of Bavaria